The Palace Hotel in Gallup, New Mexico, at 236 W. 66th Ave., was built in 1912.  It was listed on the National Register of Historic Places in 1988.

It has also been known as the Palace Lodge.

It is a two-story hipped roof building which is Richardsonian Romanesque in style, the only building of that style in Gallup.

References

Hotels in New Mexico
National Register of Historic Places in McKinley County, New Mexico
Romanesque Revival architecture in New Mexico
Commercial buildings completed in 1912
1912 establishments in New Mexico